Man Bites Harmonica! is an album by harmonica player Jean "Toots" Thielemans which was recorded in late 1957 and early 1958 for the Riverside label.

Reception

Allmusic awarded the album 4½ stars. In his review, Scott Yanow states "Even four decades later, no jazz harmonica player has dethroned the great Toots".

Track listing
All compositions by Toots Thielemans except as indicated
 "East of the Sun" (Brooks Bowman) - 7:14     
 "Don't Blame Me" (Dorothy Fields, Jimmy McHugh) - 2:27     
 "18th Century Ballroom" (Ray Bryant) - 3:46     
 "Soul Station" - 6:58     
 "Fundamental Frequency" - 4:54     
 "Struttin' With Some Barbecue" (Lil Hardin Armstrong, Don Raye) - 4:30     
 "Imagination" (Johnny Burke, Jimmy Van Heusen) - 4:27     
 "Isn't It Romantic?" (Lorenz Hart, Richard Rodgers) - 5:16  
Recorded at Reeves Sound Studios in New York City on December 30, 1957 (tracks 1, 3-6 & 8) and January 7, 1958 (tracks 2 & 7)

Personnel 
Jean "Toots" Thielemans - harmonica, guitar
Pepper Adams - baritone saxophone (1, 3-6, 8)
Kenny Drew - piano
Wilbur Ware - bass
Art Taylor - drums

References 

1958 albums
Toots Thielemans albums
Albums produced by Orrin Keepnews
Riverside Records albums